Juan Fontena (born February 15, 1987), is a Chilean professional basketball player.  He currently plays for the Club Deportivo Valdivia club of the Liga Nacional de Básquetbol de Chile.

He represented Chile's national basketball team at the 2016 South American Basketball Championship, where he recorded most blocks for his team.

References

External links
 Juan Fontena: “En Chile recibí la oportunidad que no tuve en mi país” Life story on CORREO Del ORINOCO 
 Latinbasket.com profile
 REAL GM profile

1987 births
Living people
Chilean men's basketball players
Power forwards (basketball)
Centers (basketball)
People from Carúpano
Venezuelan emigrants to Chile
Chile men's national basketball team players